{{DISPLAYTITLE:C4H4N2O3}}
The molecular formula C4H4N2O3 (molar mass: 128.09 g/mol, exact mass: 128.0222 u) may refer to:

 Barbituric acid (or malonylurea)
 5-Hydroxyuracil

Molecular formulas